The Erskine-Hill Baronetcy, of Quothquhan in the County of Lanark, is a title in the Baronetage of the United Kingdom. It was created on 22 June 1945 for Alexander Erskine-Hill, Unionist Member of Parliament for Edinburgh North from 1935 to 1945.

Erskine-Hill baronets, of Quothquhan (1945)
Sir Alexander Galloway Erskine-Hill, 1st Baronet (1894–1947)
Sir Robert Erskine-Hill, 2nd Baronet (1917–1989)
Sir (Alexander) Roger Erskine-Hill, 3rd Baronet (born 1949)

References

Kidd, Charles, Williamson, David (editors). Debrett's Peerage and Baronetage (1990 edition). New York: St Martin's Press, 1990.

Erskine-Hill
Clan Erskine